Il viaggio is a 2017 Italian comedy-drama film directed by Alfredo Arciero.

Plot
The stories of five people, a politician, an actress, a university assistant, an oenologist and an entrepreneur, are intertwined aboard a train along the Sulmona-Carpinone railway, the so-called "Trans-Siberian of Italy", between Abruzzo and Molise. Influenced by the beauty of the landscapes and the encounters with unknown people who are on the same train, the journey becomes an opportunity for them to reflect on their life and on the importance of the values of love, friendship and solidarity.

Cast
Maurizio Santilli as Maurizio
Danila Stalteri as Noemi
Daniela Terreri as Daniela
Marco Caldoro as Marco
Fabio Ferrari as Fabio
Gaetano Amato as Alfredo
Lucianna De Falco as Serena
Angelo Orlando as the friar
Sergio Sivori as Professor Terzi
Angela Pepi as Patrizia
Barbara Petti as Paola
Palma Spina as Palma
Diego Florio as Aarif

References

External links

2017 films
2010s Italian-language films
2017 comedy-drama films
Italian comedy-drama films
Films directed by Alfredo Arciero
Films set in Abruzzo
Films set in Molise
Films shot in Abruzzo
Films shot in Molise
2010s Italian films